Valery Valentinovich Alekseyev (born 16 February 1979) is a former Russian professional association football player.

Honours
Belarusian Premier League champion: 2004

Betting scandal
He was one of the players and coaches named by Professional Football League on 1 September 2010 as making bets on their own team's results.

References

External links
 

1979 births
Sportspeople from Pskov
Living people
Russian footballers
Association football midfielders
Russian Premier League players
Russian expatriate footballers
Expatriate footballers in Belarus
FC Anzhi Makhachkala players
FC Fakel Voronezh players
FC Dinamo Minsk players
FC Salyut Belgorod players
FC Oryol players
FC Spartak Kostroma players
FC Dynamo Stavropol players